Daniel I. Khomskii (Даниил Ильич Хомский) graduated from Moscow State University in 1962. Starting in 1965, he worked in the Theoretical Department of the Lebedev Physical Institute of the Russian Academy of Science in Moscow. 
There, he defended his PhD in 1969. In 1980, he obtained a second
doctoral degree–the Russian equivalent to the German Habilitation or a professorship in
the US. From 1992 to 2003, he was a professor at Groningen University in the Netherlands
and since 2003, he has been a guest Professor in Köln (Cologne University) in Germany.

His main research interests are the theory of systems with strongly correlated electrons,
metal-insulator transitions, magnetism, orbital ordering (Kugel-Khomskii model) and
superconductivity. He was elected a Fellow of the American Physical Society in 2008 and
has published roughly 300 papers over the course of his career.

References

Year of birth missing (living people)
Living people
Russian physicists